Lallemantia canescens is a species of flowering plant in the mint family. Its native range includes Iran, Turkey, Armenia, and Azerbaijan.

Notes

References
 

Lamiaceae
Plants described in 1753
Taxa named by Carl Linnaeus